String Quartet in D major (with neither an official number or an opus number) by English composer Benjamin Britten  was written in 1931. He revised it during his final illness, and it was first published in 1974.

History
The quartet was completed during Britten's second year of study at the Royal College of Music. Britten showed the score to his mentor Frank Bridge, who called its counterpoint "too vocal". John Ireland, his official teacher, disagreed. It was played through privately by the Stratton Quartet in 1932. Britten was "v. pleased" with the result, "it sounds more or less as I intended it".

In 1974, the composer revised it for publication, at the urging of Donald Mitchell. The revisions seem to have been fairly small.

Structure and analysis
The quartet is in three movements:
 Allegro maestoso
 Lento ed espressivo
 Allegro giocoso

A complete performance takes about 19 minutes.

Musicologist Peter Evans considered it an immediate background to, and to strongly foreshadow, Britten's Sinfonietta, which was published in 1932 as his Op. 1.

Recordings 

 1986Endellion Quartet
 1991Britten Quartet, Collins Classics 11152
 1998Sorrel Quartet, Chandos CHAN 9664
 2010Emperor Quartet, BIS 1540

References 

1931 compositions
1931
String quartet Britten 0